is a Japanese video game artist. Yoshida was born in 1967 and joined Square in 1995, before the company merged with Enix. He then left Square Enix in September 2013 and became freelance. In October 2014, he became the company director of CyDesignation, a subsidiary of Cygames.
He is well known for his work on the Final Fantasy series. He is a frequent collaborator of game designer Yasumi Matsuno.

Biography
In 1995, Yoshida joined Square and with each project he took on, he experimented with different styles of graphic design. He has compared his use of color to that of Kingdom Hearts character designer Tetsuya Nomura, and the keeping of color consistent between the characters and the game world.

For the game Tactics Ogre, pencil etchings and CG coloration were used together for the first time. Yoshida considers the tone and style of the game to be the "ideal" art style and thus within his comfort zone. The original tarot card illustrations for the game were done for dot graphics, and reflected a limited color index. When remade for the PlayStation Portable, some staff wanted to use the original illustrations, but Yoshida requested to redraw the illustrations with more detail and color than was possible or required previously.

In designing the character of Vaan for Final Fantasy XII, initially the character was "rugged" and "tough", but after considering the demographics of the games audience, the character was made younger and thinner. Once the actors motion captured and voice actor Kohei Takeda did the part, the character became slightly less effeminate than was originally designed.
Yoshida set out to create a cast of characters who looked unlike any previous Final Fantasy cast. He also stated that the character reflected what Japanese audiences want, but that they try to design characters everyone likes.

In addition to his work in video games, Yoshida designed the original characters for the 2018 directorial debut film of screenwriter Mari Okada entitled  Maquia: When the Promised Flower Blooms.

Reception
He has been cited as a "fantastic" artist by Kotaku, and his work on Vagrant Story and Final Fantasy XII was called "brilliant" and "refined" by IGN.

Works
 Zeliard (1987): Graphic design
 Faria: A World of Mystery and Danger (1989): Graphic design
 Musashi no Bouken (1991): Graphic design
 Ogre Battle (1993): Character design, tarot card design
 Tactics Ogre (1995): Background art director, character design
 Final Fantasy Tactics (1997): Background art director, character design
 Vagrant Story (2000): Background art director, character design
 Wild Card (2001): Main visual
 Final Fantasy Tactics Advance (2003): Artistic supervisor
 Final Fantasy XII (2006): Background art supervisor, main character design
 Final Fantasy III (Nintendo DS) (2006): Character design
 Final Fantasy Tactics: The War of the Lions (2007): Background art director, character design
 Final Fantasy Tactics A2: Grimoire of the Rift (2007): Artistic supervisor
 Final Fantasy XII International Zodiac Job System (2007): Background art supervisor, main character design
 Final Fantasy: The 4 Heroes of Light (2009): Character design
 Final Fantasy XIV (2010): Art director, main character design
 Tactics Ogre: Let Us Cling Together (2010): Character design
 Dissidia 012 Final Fantasy (2011)): Special thanks
 Bravely Default: Flying Fairy (2012): Main character design
 Bravely Default: Praying Brage (2012): Main character design
 Final Fantasy XIV: A Realm Reborn (2013): Lead artist, main character design
 Knights of Glory (2013): Main character design
 Battle Champs (2015): Main character design
 Bravely Second: End Layer (2015): Main character design
 Final Fantasy XIV: Heavensward (2015): Main character design
 Nier: Automata (2017): Main character design
 Final Fantasy XIV: Stormblood (2017): Main character design
 Final Fantasy XII: The Zodiac Age (2017): Promotional illustrator, main character design
 Lost Order (2017): Art director
 Maquia: When the Promised Flower Blooms (2018): Original character design
 Final Fantasy XIV: Shadowbringers (2019): Main character design
 Nier Reincarnation (2021): Main character design
 Nier Replicant ver.1.22474487139... (2021): Character illustration
 Little Noah: Scion of Paradise (2022): Character design
 Nier Automata ver1.1a (2023): Original character design

References

External links
Character Art of Akihiko Yoshida

1967 births
Living people
Video game artists
Japanese artists
Final Fantasy designers
Square Enix people